Kareeb (English: Intimate) is a 1998 Indian Hindi-language romance film written, produced and directed by Vidhu Vinod Chopra. It stars Bobby Deol and Neha Bajpai.

Plot 
Birju Kumar is a young man from an upper-middle-class family in Himachal Pradesh. His father insists on him being responsible, while Birju is interested in petty theft, lies, and romancing a beautiful young woman named Neha. Neha is a simple, beautiful, and responsible girl from a poor family. When Birju first sees Neha, he immediately falls in love with her. Neha also starts liking Birju but hides her feelings. Birju tries everything to impress Neha and eventually she realizes how much she loves Birju and can't live without him.

Birju's father does not want Birju to marry into a poor family but Birju lies that Nehas's uncle is rich and arranges their wedding. Birju steals money from his home and pretends that the money has been sent by Neha's uncle. However, on the night of the wedding, Birju's father discovers the truth and calls off the wedding.

Neha's mother, unable to withstand this emotional distress, suffers a heart attack. When Birju meets Neha she is very distraught for her mother and angry at Birju for lying. Neha makes Birju promise that he will never show his face again. Neha then takes her mother to a Shimla hospital in an ambulance and Birju follows. Birju later spends that night sleeping on the steps of a laundry shop owned by Bhigelal. Bhigelal is an interesting character with the dream of visiting England one day and owns a collection of antique coins to sell to a diwanji. With the money earned by selling coins and operating his laundry shop, he plans to visit England just as his father dreamed of. He then hires Birju as a laundry boy. This is Birju's first job which he accepts to stay near Neha and earn money to support her mother's treatment. One day after work Birju meets Uncle and Aunty. They treat Birju as their son and offer to help him whenever he needs it.

At the hospital, Birju inquires about Neha's mother, where he was told by the receptionist that she needs an immediate operation and it will be very expensive. In the next scene, Doctor Abhay first appears after Neha tries to contact Birju for help but is unable to reach him. Doctor Abhay is very fond of Neha and proposes to marry her in exchange for her mother's operation for free because doctors can provide free services to their relatives.

Birju goes to Uncle and Aunty who propose he buys a lottery ticket, which they will ensure he wins by bribing corrupt government officials. They ask Birju to get them some money for the bribe. Birju buys the lottery ticket as instructed and works hard all day to collect the money for the bribe. He then gives it to Uncle and Aunty but eventually realizes the couple were not who they claimed to be and had taken money from many other people just like him, and ran away. Helpless Birju steals the money from Bhigelal to pay for the surgery. He returns to the hospital with the money and gives it to the doctor, asking the doctor to not tell Neha.

Eventually, Birju's family realizes Birju's love for Neha and decide to support their son in Simla. They reach Simla and handle things with Bhigelal who goes mad on seeing his robbed drawer with Birju's note promising to return the money. Neha learns that Birju helped her and wants to meet him. They both meet again on a staircase of the hospital and time stops again to see them deeply in love.

Cast
Bobby Deol as Brij Kumar
Shabana Raza as Neha
Moushumi Chatterjee as Neha's mother
Johnny Lever as Bighelaal
Amit Phalke as Chandru
Sushma Seth as Mrs. Ranbir Singh
Saurabh Shukla as Birju's father
Shammi Kapoor as Thakur Ranbir Singh
Vijayendra Ghatge as Diwan Virendranath

Soundtrack
Anu Malik composed the film's music and Rahat Indori penned the lyrics.

References

External links
 

1998 films
1990s Hindi-language films
Films directed by Vidhu Vinod Chopra
Films scored by Anu Malik